The United States Army tugboat MG Winfield Scott (LT-805) was built by Moss Point Marine, Escatawpa, Mississippi and delivered to the U.S. Army on 29 October 1993. She is named for Major General Winfield Scott.

In October 2021 the MG Winfield Scott was sold at auction to Interlake Maritime Services and brought to Ludington, Michigan, arriving on November 29, 2021.

All are based in Ludington.

References

Ships of the United States Army
1993 ships
Tugboats of the United States